The plazas de soberanía (lit. "strongholds of sovereignty") is a term describing a series of Spanish overseas minor territories scattered along the Mediterranean coast bordering Morocco or that are closer to Africa than Europe. This term is used for those territories that have been a part of Spain since the formation of the modern country (1492–1556), as opposed to African territories acquired by Spain during the 19th and early 20th centuries in the Scramble for Africa.

Historically, a distinction was made between the so-called "major places of sovereignty", comprising the autonomous cities of Ceuta and Melilla, and the "minor places of sovereignty", referring to a number of islands (and a small peninsula) along the coast. In the present, the term refers mainly to the latter.

History 

During the Reconquista and mainly following the conquest of Granada in 1492, forces of the Castilian and Portuguese kingdoms conquered and maintained numerous posts in North Africa for trade and as a defence against Barbary piracy.

In August 1415, the Portuguese conquered the city of Ceuta. In 1481, the Papal bull Aeterni regis had granted all land south of the Canary Islands to Portugal. Only this archipelago and the possessions of Santa Cruz de la Mar Pequeña (1476–1524), Melilla (conquered by Pedro de Estopiñán in 1497), Villa Cisneros (founded in 1502 in current Western Sahara), Mazalquivir (1505), Peñón de Vélez de la Gomera (1508), Oran (1509–1708; 1732–1792), Algiers (1510–1529), Bugia (1510–1554), Tripoli (1511–1551), and Tunis (1535–1569) remained as Spanish territory in Africa. Finally, following the independence of Portugal after the end of the Spanish-led Iberian Union, Ceuta was ceded by Portugal to Spain in 1668.

In 1848, Spanish troops conquered the Islas Chafarinas. In the late 19th century, after the so-called Scramble for Africa, European nations had taken over colonial control of most of the African continent. The Treaty of Fez (signed on 30 March 1912) made most of Morocco a protectorate of France, while Spain assumed the role of protecting power over the northern part, Spanish Morocco.

When Spain relinquished its protectorate and recognized Morocco's independence in 1956, it did not give up these minor territories, as Spain had held them well before the establishment of its protectorate.

On 11 July 2002, Morocco stationed six gendarmes on Perejil Island, which was at the time a source of complaint by Spain. The Spanish Armed Forces responded by launching a military operation code-named Operation Romeo-Sierra. The operation was carried out by Spanish commandos of Grupo de Operaciones Especiales. The Spanish Navy and Spanish Air Force provided support; the six Moroccan navy cadets did not offer any resistance and were captured and evicted from the island. It has since been evacuated by both countries.

On 3 january 2020, 42 migrants went to the Chafarinas island and the Spanish guardia civil ordered the immediate expulsion without following the legal procedure. The Spanish NGO 'Walking Border' denounced the “hot returns” as violations of international law.

Physical geography 

In addition to Ceuta and Melilla, there are historically three minor plazas de soberanía:

Apart from these, there are two other islands usually considered within the plazas de soberanía. The disputed Perejil Island, a small uninhabited islet close to Ceuta, is considered by Spain to be a part of Ceuta and not a territory in its own right. Alboran Island, another small island in the western Mediterranean, about 50 kilometres (31.05 miles) from the African coast and 90 kilometres (55.92 miles) from Europe, is administered as part of the municipality of Almería on the Iberian Peninsula.

Political geography
The plazas de soberanía are small islands and a peninsula off the coast of Morocco (the only peninsula, Peñón de Vélez de la Gomera, was an island until a 1934 storm formed a sand bridge with the mainland). They are guarded by military garrisons and administered directly by the Spanish central government.

Like Ceuta and Melilla, they are a part of Spain, therefore also part of the European Union, and their currency is the euro.

Territorial dispute with Morocco 
Morocco claims sovereignty over the plazas de soberanía, including Ceuta and Melilla.

See also 

 List of islands of Spain
 List of Spanish colonial wars in Morocco
 Morocco–Spain border
 Nadim al-Maghrebi
 Spanish protectorate in Morocco

Notes

References 

 
Spanish Africa
Subdivisions of Spain
Mediterranean
Enclaves and exclaves
Territorial disputes of Spain
Territorial disputes of Morocco